Ivaň may refer to places in the Czech Republic:

Ivaň (Brno-Country District), a municipality and village in South Moravian Region
Ivaň (Prostějov District), a municipality and village in Olomouc Region

See also
Ivan (disambiguation)